The A45 is a major road in England.  It runs east from Birmingham past the National Exhibition Centre and the M42, then bypasses Coventry and Rugby, where it briefly merges with the M45 until it continues to Daventry. It then heads to Northampton and Wellingborough before running north of Rushden and Higham Ferrers and terminating at its junction with the A14 in Thrapston.

Prior to the construction of the M6 motorway, it was the main route from the Midlands to Ipswich and to the Haven ports. When the A1-M1 link road section of the current A14 opened in 1994, most of the A45 to the east of Cambridge was re-designated as the A14 and some sections to the west were downgraded to B-roads (including the B645 between Higham Ferrers and St Neots).

History
The original (1923) route of the A45 was Birmingham to Ipswich. The road was extended to Felixstowe in 1935, replacing the A139 (see this on SABRE Maps). Around the same time, the A45 was rerouted around the south of Coventry when the city's southern bypass was completed ). 

Initially, the A45 passed through Ipswich to Felixstowe; when the Ipswich bypass was completed in 1985, the road was diverted to pass over the Orwell Bridge which opened in 1982.

A bypass for the village of Eltisley was built in 1972, along with a bypass on the B1040 road. The  £8 million St Neots bypass opened in December 1985 on what was then the A45.

Bypasses and realignments
Small Heath (Now bypassed to the south)
Meriden (Now bypassed to the north)
Coventry (An early bypass to the south)
Daventry (The route now follows the ring road)
Weedon Bec and Flore (Bypassed to the north)
Northampton (Bypassed, the former route being A4500)
Higham Ferrers (Bypassed to the west of the town)

Re-designation
When the new A14 link road between the A1 near Huntingdon and the M1 (at its junction with the M6) was opened to traffic in the mid-1990s, the Cambridge to Felixstowe stretch of the A45 was re-designated as the A14 (and many of the villages the route went through were bypassed) and the St Neots to Cambridge section became part of an extended A428. The route through Felixstowe at the end of the A14 is now the A154.

Route

Birmingham to Dunchurch
The road starts on the A4540 Birmingham Ring Road, bypassing Small Heath and crossing the B4145. It passes over the River Cole and meets the A4040 at a grade-separated junction at the Swan Shopping Centre in Yardley. It meets the B425 at traffic lights in Sheldon, then enters the borough of Solihull. The section of the A45 from Birmingham city centre to the M45 is all dual carriageway — urban dual carriageway with traffic lights until Birmingham Airport, then rural grade-separated between the airport and Coventry. The Bickenhill Junction (grade-separated) intersects with the B4438, a dual carriageway access road for the airport, N.E.C. and Birmingham International railway station. There is another grade-separated junction with the M42 junction 6 (three level grade separation with roundabout). On this junction, there is also access to the National Motorcycle Museum. The road meets the A452 at Stonebridge at a grade separated junction and passes over the River Blythe where the road briefly enters Warwickshire. Meriden is bypassed to the north. The Heart of England Way passes under the road, and the road enters the borough of Coventry.

The A45 becomes an urban road and skirts the south side of Coventry, crossing the A4114 near Allesley Park, the B4101 at Tile Hill, West Coast Main Line, A429 and B4113. Beyond here the road takes a more rural nature, with a grade-separated junction with the A46 and the A444  (three level roundabout with underpass for the A46 and the A444, and an overpass for the A45). Between here and the next junction, the A45 runs concurrent with the A46. The Tollbar End roundabout was one of the busiest in the Midlands. It had exits for the A46 north / Coventry Eastern Bypass, Coventry Airport and B4110. In early 2017, the Tollbar End roundabout was upgraded and the junction is now a roundabout interchange with an underpass for the A46. Crossing the River Avon, the road re-enters Warwickshire. The A423 exits to the south-east at a (grade-separated) forked junction near the former Peugeot factory. The A445 crosses at a roundabout near Ryton on Dunsmore, followed by the War Memorial Roundabout with the B4455 Fosse Way. This Portland stone memorial obelisk on the roundabout just north of Stretton-on-Dunsmore commemorates King George V's review of the 29th Division before they were sent to Gallipoli. There is a further grade-separated junction with the A4071 and B4453 towards Rugby. The final roundabout on this section is the start of the M45 and the B4429. For , the A45 runs concurrent with the M45 until a fairly new junction beyond Dunchurch. The B4429 carried the A45 until the new junction was built.

Dunchurch to Thrapston
Heading towards Daventry, the road is single carriageway. The road passes two prisons: HMP Onley and HMP Rye Hill. After Willoughby, the road enters Northamptonshire, where it crosses the Oxford Canal and Grand Union Canal near Braunston. The Jurassic Way crosses the road here. The road enters Daventry and briefly runs concurrent with the A425 heading to Leamington Spa, then heads south-east on the Daventry bypass, here called the Stefen Way. The road meets the B4038 at a roundabout where the A425 exits. The road heads west past Dodford and then bypasses Weedon Bec, crossing the West Coast Main Line and Grand Union Canal and then meets the A5 at a roundabout constructed as part of the Daventry Development Link Road realignment which opened on 15 November 2018.
 This road also bypasses Flore, before meeting the grade-separated M1 Junction 16, briefly running concurrent with the M1.

The A45 resumes at M1 Junction 15 as a dual carriageway, heading around the south side of Northampton. It then meets the older route (made of sections of the A5076 and A4500) at the A45 / A508 grade-separated junction, near Northampton High School. It then crosses the River Nene and Nene Way, and after that, there is a large grade-separated junction with the A428 and the A5095). This section is concurrent with the A43, which exits at a grade-separated junction near Weston Favell. The grade-separated junction with the end of the A5076 is also the exit for Billing Aquadrome. The road has a grade-separated junction with the B573 near Earls Barton. The road then meets the Wellingborough bypass (A509) at a roundabout, although there is a segregated turn lane for westbound traffic wishing to continue on the A45. It runs concurrently with the A509 to the grade-separated junction  near the bridge over the River Nene, where the A509 exits south near Irchester Country Park. East of Wellingborough, the road crosses the Midland Main Line. There is a grade-separated junction for the A5001 into Rushden and the route runs alongside the River Nene, offering a second turning to Rushden at a roundabout with the A5001 again; at this second junction, the original route to the A1 has been reclassified the B645. At the roundabout with the A6 near Higham Ferrers, it starts the follow the former route of the A605. The section of dual carriageway from the M1 now ends at the next roundabout and the route from there is now single carriageway. This is the start of the Raunds bypass. The next roundabout is with the B663. The route bypasses Ringstead and the A45 finishes at a grade-separated junction with the A14 (roundabout with overpass for the A14) near Thrapston.

References

External links
SABRE - The A45

Roads in England
Transport in Birmingham, West Midlands
Transport in Leicestershire
Transport in Northamptonshire
Roads in Warwickshire
Roads in the West Midlands (county)
Roads in Coventry
Proposed roads in the United Kingdom
Wellingborough
Transport in Northampton